Anthony Joseph Iapoce (born August 23, 1973) is a former baseball player and coach who most recently served as the hitting coach for the Chicago Cubs of Major League Baseball (MLB). He is currently manager for the Toledo Mud Hens.

Career
Iapoce played college baseball at Lamar University and was drafted by the Milwaukee Brewers in the 33rd round of the 1994 Major League Baseball Draft. He played in the Brewers organization until 2000 and spent 2002 and 2003 in the Florida Marlins organization, after which he spent 2004 and 2005 playing with the Gary SouthShore Railcats of the independent Northern League.

Prior to the 2016 season, Iapoce was hired by the Texas Rangers to be their hitting coach, a position he held through the 2018 season..

On October 15, 2018 the Chicago Cubs hired Iapoce to be their hitting coach.   Iapoce began the 2019 season wearing number 43, but switched to number 4 on June 23 upon the call up of Tony Barnette. Iapoce and the Cubs parted ways following the 2021 season.

On February 3, 2022, Iapoce was hired by the Boston Red Sox to serve as the senior hitting coordinator.

References

External links

1973 births
Living people
Albuquerque Isotopes players
Arizona League Brewers players
Baseball players from New York (state)
Beloit Snappers players
Chicago Cubs coaches
El Paso Diablos players
Gary SouthShore RailCats players
Helena Brewers players
Huntsville Stars players
Indianapolis Indians players
Lamar Cardinals baseball players
Louisville RiverBats players
Major League Baseball hitting coaches
People from Astoria, Queens
Portland Sea Dogs players
Stockton Ports players
Texas Rangers coaches
Tucson Toros players